On June 28, 2018, in the Xuhui District of Shanghai, China, three boys and a female parent were stabbed with a knife near the gate of the West Campus of the   at Pubei Road, Shanghai. Two boys who attended died, and another student and parent were injured. The suspect, Huang Yichuan, was arrested by the Procuratorate the next day.

On December 6, 2018, the first trial of the case was held. The murder was found to be the result of the defendant's hopelessness for life and his desire for revenge on society. The prosecutor pointed out that Huang Yichuan had schizophrenia. On May 23, 2019,  decided that Huang's mental illness did not affect his ability to control his own behavior. The court then imposed the death penalty, as well as depriving his political rights for life. On December 30, 2019, the  rejected the appeal on Huang Yichuan's ruling, upheld the original judgment, and submitted it to the Supreme People's Court for approval. On December 3, 2020, Huang Yichuan was executed.

Description of the attack 
At 11:31 a.m. on June 28, the Xuhui Branch of Shanghai Municipal Public Security Bureau received a phone call, saying that a man with a kitchen knife had cut three boys and a female parent near the sidewalk of Guilin West Street on Pubei Road. With the help of others at the scene of the attack, the police arrested Huang Yichuan, the assailant, and sent the injured victims to the hospital. By noon on June 28, two of the boys had died. At 1:50 p.m., the Xuhui police issued a call for information.

According to a video uploaded by netizens, the two boys fell to the ground after being stabbed. There was a lot of blood at the scene, and some people used towels to stop the children's bleeding. A kitchen knife was also seen on the ground. A number of people at the scene, including the staff of city management, held Huang Yichuan down to prevent his escape, and a passing air conditioner repairman tied him up with a rope. After the police arrived, Huang was arrested and offered no resistance during the entire process.

One of the students, known only as Tan, was confirmed to have died from injury to the central nervous system and hemorrhagic shock due to the stabbing. The other student who died, known as Fei, died of a brain injury and hemorrhagic shock, due to the stabbing of his head, face, and left palm. The third student, Jin, and the parent, Zhang, only suffered minor head injuries.

Identity of the perpetrator 

According to an examination of the First Branch of Shanghai People's Procuratorate, the criminal suspect, Huang Yichuan, male, was unemployed at the time of the attack. He claimed that after a failure to find employment in many places, he went to Shanghai in early June 2018. After arriving, Huang came up with the idea to take revenge on society through murder. On the morning of June 28, he set out from his hotel with a stainless-steel kitchen knife and took a bus to Guilin West Street near the World Foreign Language Primary School. At about 11 a.m., he saw three students and a parent leaving the school. To avoid the security patrol at the school gate, he followed the group and stabbed them about 130 meters away from the school gate.

After the incident, his personal information was exposed through Human flesh search engine. According to a screenshot of Huang Yichuan's basic personal information that circulated on the Internet, he was born on June 3, 1989, in Hunan Province Suining County, and had been a student in the school of architecture of Hunan University of Science and Technology (HUST). Some students at HUST confirmed that Huang Yichuan had previously studied with them at HUST. They also mentioned that he had antisocial tendencies when he was a university student. When Huang graduated from the college, he left many threatening messages on Tencent QQ to many students. During the six years after his graduation, he participated in the Postgraduate Admission Test many times but always failed. In addition, during those years he had changed jobs more than ten times.

According to a survey conducted by Caixin Online, Huang Yichuan's parents divorced when he was a child. His childhood home was in a building designed for the family of local civil servants in Suining County. Additionally, his grandmother, Wu, was found to have had schizophrenia for decades. In 2012 and 2013, Huang Yichuan failed the Postgraduate Admission Test twice and repeatedly failed to find a job, but he still hid the truth from his family and friends, claiming that he had a high income and perfect life. During the Spring Festival before the Pubei Knife Murders, Huang's mother thought that her son was more withdrawn and irritable, and some distant relatives thought that he may have inherited his grandmother's schizophrenia. In the year before the murders, Huang Yichuan traveled to Xiamen, Wuhan, Guangzhou, Shanghai, and other cities, where he visited many kindergartens and primary schools, planning to commit the murders. A month before the Pubei murders, Huang Yichuan took the train from Guangzhou to Shanghai, spending most of his time at a youth hostel in the Pudong New Area. A few days before the incident, he heard on the radio that the Shanghai World Foreign Language Primary School was going to hold a graduation ceremony, so he determined to commit the murders on students from that school.

Criminal proceedings 

On June 28, 2018, the first branch of the Shanghai Municipal People's Procuratorate and the Xuhui District procuratorate appointed prosecutors to intervene in the case to guide the investigation and evidence collection. On June 29, the Xuhui District Procuratorate approved the arrest according to the law. On August 14, the first branch of the Shanghai Municipal People's Procuratorate initiated a public prosecution against Huang Yichuan for intentional murder to the First Intermediate People's Court of Shanghai. On December 6, the case was heard in a court session of the First Intermediate People's Court of Shanghai, attended by representatives of the National People's Congress, representatives of the Shanghai Municipal People's Congress, the victims' families, and more than 50 other people. After the judicial identification, Huang Yichuan was diagnosed with schizophrenia, and as a result, held limited criminal responsibility. During the trial, the procuratorate recommended the court to punish him according to the provisions of the third paragraph of Article 18 of the Criminal Law of the People's Republic of China. However, the court also considered that his motive for killing was particularly sinister, the crime had been planned for a long time, and the killing method was particularly brutal.

At 10:00 a.m. on May 23, 2019, the First Intermediate People's Court of Shanghai issued the first judgment on the case. The defendant Huang Yichuan was sentenced to death for intentional homicide, and he was sentenced to be deprived of political rights for life. In the judgment, the First Intermediate People's Court of Shanghai pointed out that Huang Yichuan decided to kill primary school students in order to vent his anger because he "thought he was being bullied and hurt by others." He had premeditated and prepared serious violence against innocent children, with despicable motives and cruel means. Although Huang Yichuan has schizophrenia and, therefore, had limited criminal responsibility, his crime was extremely serious, and the court decided that his mental illness did not affect his ability to control his behavior in this case. After the sentence, the defendant did not appeal in court. According to a reporter, the sentencing on the morning of May 23 lasted only about half an hour, and the defendant appeared very calm.

Later, Huang formally made an appeal. On August 30, 2019, the second instance of the case opened for trial. In the second trial, Huang Yichuan argued that he did not plan to kill people in advance, and that he was committing homicide in a state of insanity. However, the procuratorial organ believed that the facts of Huang Yichuan's homicide were clear, the applicable law was correct, and the trial procedure was legal, meaning that his sentence was appropriate. Therefore, it was suggested that the court of second instance should reject the appeal and maintain its original judgment. At 12 a.m. of that day, the trial of second instance came to a close. On December 30, 2019, the Shanghai Senior People's Court held a court session to make a public judgment on the appeal case, and they ruled to reject the appeal and uphold the original judgment that Huang Yichuan was sentenced to death and deprived of his political rights for life. On December 3, 2020, Huang Yichuan was executed.

References

Notes

Citations 

June 2018 events in China
Coordinates on Wikidata
Mass stabbings in China
Stabbing attacks in 2018
Massacres in China
Mass murder in 2018
June 2018 crimes in Asia
Knife attacks
2018 murders in China
Xuhui District
21st-century mass murder in China